Ceretes is a genus of moths within the family Castniidae. It was described by Schaufuss in 1870.

Species
 Ceretes marcelserres (Godart, [1824])
 Ceretes thais (Drury, 1782)

References

Castniidae